Janet Stewart may refer to:
 Janet Stewart (broadcaster), Canadian television news anchor
 Janet Stewart, Lady Fleming, Scottish courtier
 Janet Stewart, Lady Ruthven, Scottish aristocrat